Acleros neavei is a butterfly in the family Hesperiidae. It is found in Uganda, the Democratic Republic of the Congo (from the eastern part of the country to the Ituri District) and Tanzania (the eastern shore of Lake Tanganyika).

References

Butterflies described in 1937
Erionotini